Robert Huw Morgan (born 1967) is a Welsh-born organist and choral conductor. He serves as the University Organist at Stanford University's Memorial Church

Biography 
A native of Newport, Wales, Morgan received his bachelor's and master's degrees from the University of Cambridge, where he was an organ scholar at St. John's College under George Guest. He earned doctorates in organ performance and choral conducting from the University of Washington School of Music, studying with Carole Terry and Peter Erős.

As a conductor, he has led performances of several operas (Falstaff, Hansel & Gretel and Die Fledermaus, among others), as well as large-scale choral works including Bach's St. John Passion and Mass in B minor, Mozart's Requiem and Mass in C minor, and the Vespers of Rachmaninoff and Monteverdi. He has performed the complete organ works of J.S. Bach and Dieterich Buxtehude.

In addition to his duties at the Memorial Church, he holds the positions of Lecturer in Organ and Choral Studies and Director of the Stanford University Singers. He is a fellow of the Royal College of Organists.

External links 
 Stanford University Music School Bio
 Stanford University Memorial Church Bio

American classical organists
British male organists
American choral conductors
American male conductors (music)
Alumni of St John's College, Cambridge
University of Washington College of Arts and Sciences alumni
Stanford University Department of Music faculty
1967 births
Welsh classical organists
Living people
Welsh conductors (music)
British male conductors (music)
Welsh choral conductors
Articles containing video clips
21st-century American conductors (music)
21st-century organists
21st-century American male musicians
21st-century American keyboardists
Fellows of the Royal College of Organists
Male classical organists